Sosicrates of Rhodes (floruit c. 180 BC) was a Greek historical writer. He was born on the island Rhodes and is noted, chiefly, for his frequent mention by Diogenes Laërtius in his Lives and Opinions of Eminent Philosophers, referencing Sosicrates as the sole authority behind such facts as Aristippus having written nothing. It is inferred that Sosicrates flourished after Hermippus and before Apollodorus of Athens, and, therefore, sometime between 200 and 128 BC. Sosicrates is claimed to have penned a Successions of Philosophers, quoted by both Athenaeus and Diogenes Laërtius. Sosicrates also composed a work on the history of Crete, though neither of the aforementioned works have survived.

Notes

Sources
 Dictionary of Greek and Roman Biography and Mythology, vol. 3, page 882

2nd-century BC Rhodians
2nd-century BC writers
2nd-century BC historians
Ancient Greek biographers
Hellenistic-era historians
Ancient Rhodian historians